Catholic University of Tachira (Universidad Católica del Táchira – UCAT) in San Cristobal, capital of Táchira state in Venezuela, originated in 1962 as an extension of Andrés Bello Catholic University of the Society of Jesus.

History
The Catholic University of Tachira is a tertiary education institution born through the initiative of the Diocese of San Cristobal. It received the support of the Andrés Bello Catholic University, which in 1962 decided to open an outreach campus in Tachira. Actual activities began on 22 September 1962. It was the first institution of higher education in Tachira state. At that time the NGO "Asociación Civil" was responsible for the financial and administrative management of the university. In 1982 the outreach campus became independent from Andres Bello University by decree of the President of the Republic.

In 2012 the University was canonically recognized by Pope Benedict XVI.

Colleges and schools
The University offers 14 undergraduate and 24 graduate courses.
Legal and political sciences
 Law
Degree in Political Science
International policy
Public administration and management 
T.S.U. in Criminal and Criminal Sciences

Humanities and education
Biology and Integral Chemistry
Social Sciences
Computer Science and Mathematics

Economics and social sciences
Public Accountant degree
Degree in Administration
Business management
Human resources management
Information management
Marketing

See also 
 List of Jesuit sites
 Martín Marciales Moncada

References  

Educational institutions established in 1962
Jesuit universities and colleges
Catholic universities and colleges in Venezuela
1962 establishments in Venezuela